Ilomantsi is municipality and a village of Finland. It is located in the North Karelia region. The most eastern point of Finland and of the continental part of the European Union is located in Ilomantsi near the village of Hattuvaara. (In the EU, only Cyprus is located further to the east.)

Neighbouring municipalities are Lieksa and Joensuu. The municipality is sparsely populated and is mostly characterized by forests and boglands. About  of the area is designated as natural reserves, among them the national parks Petkeljärvi and Patvinsuo. The most important bodies of water in Ilomantsi are the lakes Koitere and Nuorajärvi and the river Koitajoki. The Pampalo gold mine is located in Ilomantsi.

The municipality is unilingually Finnish. Local words of Karelian or Russian extraction might be used in Ilomantsi. For example, the central village of the municipality is not called kirkonkylä as is usual in Finland, but pogosta (a Russian loan-word, originally pogost). Even the local newspaper is called Pogostan Sanomat, i.e. "The Pogosta News".

Ilomantsi has 17.4% Orthodox minority, which is the largest percentage among Finnish municipalities. The wooden Orthodox church of Ilomantsi is the largest in Finland and is dedicated to the prophet Elijah. There are also five Orthodox chapels (tsasouna) in the municipality. The Orthodox community of Ilomantsi is more than 500 years old and counts 1,100 members.

Demographics 
The following table shows the decrease in population of the municipality every five years since 1980. The regional allocation used is 1 January 2017.

Sights 
Ilomantsi offers a number of historical sights, beautiful scenery and nature, several unique cultural sights and events, as well as tasty culinary delights.

A few places to visit:

 Orthodox Church (built in 1892) 
 Lutheran Church (built in 1796) 
 Katri Vala Culture Center
 Lutheran Church of Kivilahti (built in 1954), Clock tower (built in 1969) 
 Research Center of Mekrijärvi 
  - A nearby village which was one of the key battlefields of the Winter War.
 Gun Workshop in Naarva - Museum (built in 1790) 
 Lutheran Church of Naarva (built in 1958), Clock tower (built in 1971) 
(An animal museum and a restaurant available)
 National Park of 
 National Park of 
  (The Fighters' House) - Museum about the Winter War and the Continuation War (built in 1988).

Notable residents 
Anna Margareta Salmelin (1716–1789).

References

External links

Ilomantsi in English
Municipality of Ilomantsi – Official website 

Parpeinvaara in English

 
Mining towns in Finland
Populated places established in 1875
1875 establishments in Finland